DXSK (1593 AM) Radio Ranao is a radio station owned and operated by Ranao Radio Broadcasting and TV System Corporation. The station's studio is located at Brgy. Raya Saduc, Marawi. This serves as the community station for the Maranaos.

References

Radio stations established in 2001
Radio stations in Lanao del Sur